is a series of three illustrated books by Japanese ukiyo-e artist Hokusai. It is considered one of Japan's most exceptional illustrated books (e-hon), and alongside the Hokusai Manga, the most influential in the West. The first two volumes were published in 1834 and 1835, shortly after completion of his seminal Thirty-six Views of Mount Fuji, with a third released in the late 1840s. 

The books contain over a hundred views of Mount Fuji in various styles and settings; Hokusai shows the peak in pure landscapes, with flora and fauna, in religious and mythological scenes and with different atmospheric effects, but above all, he focuses on ordinary people at work. 

The first two volumes are celebrated for their very high standards of woodblock printing, with "extremely fine cutting" and "exquisite gradation" (bokashi) of the grey blocks; they have been called a "masterpiece of monochrome printing".

Publication

The first two volumes have embossed pink covers and feature what is known as a "falcon-feather" title slip. They were published by Nishimuraya Yohachi, who had issued the Thirty-six Views of Mount Fuji, and Nishimura Sukezo in 1834 and 1835. The blocks were cut by the workshop of Egawa Tomekichi and are praised for their extremely high quality. Eirakuya Toshiro of Nagoya, publisher of the Hokusai Manga, issued the third volume, which is not as well printed as the first two. The date of publication is not known with certainty; the third is conventionally dated to 1849, though some prefer a date several years earlier.

The first volume is inscribed by the artist: "From the brush of the former Hokusai Iitsu changing name to Manji, the old man crazy about painting" (Saki no Hokusai Iitsu aratame Gakyo Rojin Manji hitsu). The book is the first major project of his to use the name "Manji" which he wrote with a character meaning ten thousand, a symbol of longevity. In a later pressing, at the age of seventy-five, he added his famous autobiographical colophon:

Subject matter
Coming soon after the publication of his famous Thirty-six Views of Mount Fuji, Hokusai continued his "artistic and spiritual exploration" of the mountain. Whereas the Thirty-six Views largely consists of images drawn from reality, this work features few designs rooted in a specific place. The preface to volume three describes the compositions as "eccentric". Henry Smith states the books show how Hokusai saw Fuji as "a powerful reservoir of immortality that would assist him in his personal quest to live beyond one hundred years of age and fathom ultimate artistic truths".

Art historian Jack Hillier regarded the One Hundred Views as Hokusai's "masterwork" and as a summation of his artistic philosophy and practice.

Gallery

Notes

References

External links

 

Works by Hokusai
Japanese books
Mount Fuji